Climax is a genus of beetles in the family Carabidae, containing the following species:

 Climax fissilabris Putzeys, 1861
 Climax foveilabris (Putzeys, 1861)
 Climax serratipennis Putzeys, 1866

References

Scaritinae